The First Federal League of Yugoslavia of 1951 (Prva savezna liga Jugoslavije), colloquially known as the Yugoslav First League of 1951, was the highest tier football competition played in communist Yugoslavia during 1951.

League table

Results

Winning squad
Champions:
RED STAR BELGRADE (coach: Ljubiša Broćić, replaced by Žarko Mihajlović)

players (league matches/league goals):
Tihomir Ognjanov (22/10)
Bela Palfi (22/1)
Predrag Đajić (22/1)
Kosta Tomašević (21/16)
Jovan Jezerkić (18/6)
Rajko Mitić (17/5)
Milorad Diskić (16/0)
Ivan Zvekanović (14/0)
Ljubomir Lovrić (14/0) -goalkeeper-
Branko Stanković (13/1)
Dimitrije Tadić (12/0)
Siniša Zlatković (11/4)
Todor Živanović (10/4)
Milivoje Đurđević (9/0)
Srđan Mrkušić (8/0) -goalkeeper-
Branislav Vukosavljević (7/1)
Bora Kostić (3/1)
Branko Nešović (1/0)
Lajčo Kujundžić (1/0)
Pavle Radić (1/0)

Top scorers

See also
1951 Yugoslav Second League
1951 Yugoslav Cup

External links
Yugoslavia Domestic Football Full Tables

Yugoslav First League seasons
Yugo
1
Yugo
1